This is a list of members of the Western Australian Legislative Council from 22 May 1944 to 21 May 1946. The chamber had 30 seats made up of ten provinces each electing three members, on a system of rotation whereby one-third of the members would retire at each biennial election.

Notes
 On 16 September 1944, South-East Province Country MLC Harold Piesse died. Anthony Loton, one of the three Country Party candidates, won the resulting by-election on 18 November 1944.

Sources
 
 
 

Members of Western Australian parliaments by term